Branch Back Brook is a small tributary of Back Brook in Hunterdon County, New Jersey, in the United States.

Course

See also
List of rivers of New Jersey

External links
USGS Coordinates for Google Maps

References

Tributaries of the Raritan River
Rivers of New Jersey
Rivers of Hunterdon County, New Jersey